Randii Ray Wessen (born May 13, 1958) is an American astronautics systems engineer specifically involved in planetary exploration, experimental economist, and writer. Dr. Wessen has been an employee of the California Institute of Technology's Jet Propulsion Laboratory since 1984. He is currently the A-Team Lead Study Architect for JPL's Innovation Foundry. On the side, Wessen works with Dr. David Porter of Chapman University in the field of Experimental Economics, where they are designing a system to help allocate resources for building instruments on robotic deep space planetary spacecraft. This proposed system will build on the success of the Cassini Resource Exchange and be applied to NASA's Outer Planet Flagship Missions.

Jet Propulsion Laboratory 

Wessen's first job at JPL was as the Voyager Science Sequence Coordinator for the Uranus and Neptune encounters. He helped coordinate science observation requests submitted by the eleven different Principal Investigators. These requests were integrated into one large sequence of events. These sequences of events were transmitted up to the Voyager spacecraft, executed as a series of encounter activities at the planet, and then transmitted back down to Earth as scientific data. Results were produced into charts, graphs, images, and videos, most of which had never been seen by individuals outside of the space program. He was most proud of personally building the post-encounter sequences for Neptune. It was this effort that earned him NASA's Exceptional Service Medal.

From there he moved on to the Cassini Program which was building a spacecraft destined for Saturn.  On Cassini he moved from science to system engineering.  After eight years he then changed focus and became the Telecommunications & Mission Systems Manager for the Mars Program. He worked as an intermediary between the many Mars spacecraft in both development and operations and the Deep Space Network to ensure communication between them. This work included activity with the Mars Global Surveyor, the 2001 Mars Odyssey, European Space Agency's Mars Express, Mars Reconnaissance Orbiter, and most famously the Mars Exploration Rovers.

Wessen then moved to the Navigator Program as its Program System Engineer dealing with the search of Earth-like planets around other stars.  This program had two ground-based projects (the Large Binocular Telescope Interferometer and the Michelson Science Center) and three space borne projects (the Space Interferometry Mission, the Terrestrial Planet Finder – Coronagraph, and the Terrestrial Planet Finder – Interferometer).

Wessen is currently the A-Team Lead Study Architect for JPL's Innovation Foundry. This position involves leading a team of scientists and engineers with idea generation for future mission concepts, feasibility studies of these new concepts, and trade space exploration to make sure that the mission concept going forward is the best one possible within constraints.

Publications

Notable Awards 

Fellow, Royal Astronomical Society
Fellow, British Interplanetary Society
Associate Fellow, American Institute of Aeronautics and Astronautics
NASA Exceptional Service Medal for Voyager 2 Neptune Encounter

References 

21st-century American economists
American astronomers
1958 births
Living people
Alumni of the University of South Wales
Alumni of the University of Glamorgan